A Y-STR is a short tandem repeat (STR) on the Y-chromosome. Y-STRs are often used in forensics, paternity, and genealogical DNA testing.
Y-STRs are taken specifically from the male Y chromosome. These Y-STRs provide a weaker analysis than autosomal STRs because the Y chromosome is only found in males, which are only passed down by the father, making the Y chromosome in any paternal line practically identical. This causes a significantly smaller amount of distinction between Y-STR samples. Autosomal STRs provide a much stronger analytical power because of the random matching that occurs between pairs of chromosomes during the zygote making process.

Nomenclature
Y-STRs are assigned names by the HUGO gene nomenclature committee (HGNC).

Some testing companies have different formats for the way STR markers are written. For example, the marker DYS455 may be written as DYS455, DYS 455, DYS#455, or DYS# 455. The scientific standard accepted by HUGO and NIST is DYS455.

DYS
DYS is a variation on the jargon used in human autosomal STR testing where the second character is typically reserved for the chromosome number (e.g. D8S1179).

D = DNA
Y = Y-chromosome
S = (unique) segment

Y-STR analysis
There are regions on DNA that are made up of multiple copies of short repeating sequences of bases (for example TATT) which repeat a variable number of times depending on the individual. These regions, called “variable number short tandem repeats” are what is looked at when performing STR analysis. The likelihood of two people having the same number of repeated sequences is extremely small, and becomes even smaller the more regions that are analyzed. This makes up the basis of short tandem repeat analysis. The cornerstone for this process, however, is polymerase chain reaction (PCR). This allows forensic scientists to make millions of copies of the STR regions. Gel electrophoresis then “yields the number of times each repeat unit appears in the fragment.” This allows for easy comparison of DNA.

STRs and forensics
In the United States, 13 different autosomal STR loci are used as a basis of analysis for forensic purposes. If crime scene DNA is ample and all 13 autosomal loci accessible, the likelihood of two unrelated people matching the same sample is around one in one billion.

The basis for the profile probability estimation for Y-STR analysis is the counting method. The application of a confidence interval accounts for database size and sampling variation.  The Y haplotype frequency (p) is calculated using the p = x/N formula, where x is equal to the number of times the haplotype is observed in a database containing N number of haplotypes. For example, if a haplotype has been observed twice in a database of N = 2000, the frequency of that haplotype will be: 2/2000 = 0.001.  Reporting a Y haplotype frequency, without a confidence interval, is acceptable but only provides a factual statement regarding observations of a Y haplotype in the database.  An upper confidence limit for the probability of the Y haplotype in the population should be calculated using the method described by Clopper and Pearson (1934). This uses the binomial distribution for the probabilities of counts, including zero or other small numbers that are found for Y haplotypes.

Databases

Forensic databases (without individual information, for frequency purposes):
US Y-STR Database 
Y Chromosome Haplotype Reference Database 

In genetic genealogy, Ysearch used to be the last sponsored database containing publicly submitted surnames and Y-STR haplotypes until its decommission on May 24, 2018, preceding by a day the implementation of the General Data Protection Regulation in the European Union, following a prolonged period of lacking support from its creator, Family Tree DNA. The database was founded in 2003 and reached 219 thousand records (among which 152 thousand unique haplotypes) before its shutdown. Other similar databases had disappeared earlier.

Haplogroup (Y-SNP) specific data:
Haplozone: The E-M35 Phylogeny Project (former E3b Project)

See also
List of Y-STR markers
Tandem repeat
Genealogical DNA test

References

External links

Diagrams
National Institute of Standards and Technology (NIST) — Y STR Positions along Y Chromosome

Fact sheets
National Institute of Standards and Technology (NIST) — Summary List of Y Chromosome STR Loci and Available Fact Sheets
National Institute of Standards and Technology (NIST) — STR Fact Sheets
dna.reinyday.com — DYS464
Y-STR markers — Details and statistics

Databases
yhrd.org — Y Chromosome Haplotype Reference Database
usystrdatabase.org — U.S. Y-STR Database
 — Applied Biosystems YFiler Database
ysearch.org — Y-DNA database

Tutorials
Understanding Y-DNA Short Tandem Repeat (STR)
Y-STR Marker Types
Calculation of Genetic Distance
STR training materials

Repetitive DNA sequences
Genetic genealogy